Joseph-François Duché de Vancy (29 October 1668, Paris - 14 December 1704) was a French playwright.

Life
He was the son of a gentleman in the household of Louis XIV and was himself a valet de chambre du roi. He followed Anne-Jules, 2nd duc de Noailles to Spain as his secretary. His talents gained him a pension from Madame de Maintenon, and a commission from her for Vancy and Jean Racine to compose sacred poems, edifying stories and religious tragedies for the maison de Saint-Cyr (Absalon, Jonalhas, Débora). Vancy also wrote opera librettos modelled on Racine, the best known of which were Céphale et Procris and Iphigénie en Tauride (the latter with additions by Antoine Danchet). He was a member of the Académie des inscriptions.

Works 
Plays and libretti
Céphale et Procris, tragédie lyrique, music by Élisabeth Jacquet de La Guerre, Académie royale de musique, 15 March 1694 Text online
Les Amours de Momus, ballet, music by Henri Desmarets, Académie royale de musique, 25 May 1695 Text online
Téagène et Chariclée, tragédie lyrique, music by Henri Desmarets, Académie royale de musique, 12 April 1695 Text online
Les Fêtes galantes, ballet, music by Henri Desmarets, Académie royale de musique, 10 May 1698
Jonathas, tragedy drawn from the Scriptures, Château de Versailles, 5 December 1699 Text online
Scylla, tragedy, music by Theobaldo di Gatti, Académie royale de musique, 16 September 1701 Text online
Débora, tragedy drawn from the Scriptures, 1701
Iphigénie en Tauride, tragédie lyrique, with Antoine Danchet, music by Henri Desmarets and André Campra, Académie royale de musique, 6 May 1704 Text on line
Absalon, five-act tragedy drawn from the Scriptures, 7 April 1712 Text online
Varia
Les Préceptes de Phocylide avec des remarques & des pensées & peintures critiques à l'imitation de cet auteur, 1698 Text online
Lettres inédites de Duché de Vanci contenant la relation historique du voyage de Philippe d'Anjou, appelé au trône d'Espagne, ainsi que des ducs de Bourgogne et de Berry ses frères, en 1700..., éditées par Colin et Raynaud, Paris : Librairies de Lacroix, 1830. Text online
Recueil d'histoires édifiantes, pour servir de lectures à de jeunes personnes de condition, 1706

External links 
His plays and productions of them on CÉSAR

Writers from Paris
1668 births
1704 deaths
17th-century French dramatists and playwrights
French opera librettists
Members of the Académie des Inscriptions et Belles-Lettres
French male dramatists and playwrights
17th-century French male writers